Erebomyia is a genus of flies in the family Dolichopodidae, known from the United States. Three species are known from Arizona, and one from California. The genus was first created in 2004 for Erebomyia exalloptera, a species whose males have uniquely asymmetrical wings – the left wing is larger and has a different shape compared to the right wing. The males of the remaining three species have modified but symmetrical wings.

Species
 Erebomyia aetheoptera Hurley & Runyon, 2009
 Erebomyia exalloptera Runyon & Hurley, 2004
 Erebomyia inaequalis (Van Duzee, 1930) (Synonym: E. akidoptera Hurley & Runyon, 2009)
 Erebomyia ramseyensis Hurley & Runyon, 2009

References

Dolichopodidae genera
Sympycninae
Diptera of North America